Louis Ebenezer Miller (April 30, 1899 – November 1, 1952) was a U.S. Representative from Missouri.

Born in Willisburg, Washington County, Kentucky, Miller attended the grade schools of Washington County, Kentucky, Springfield (Kentucky) High School, and St. Mary's College, St. Marys, Kansas.
During the First World War he served as a private.
He was graduated from the St. Louis University School of Law, St. Louis, Missouri, in 1921.
He was admitted to the bar the same year and commenced practice in St. Louis, Missouri.
He served as a member of the Republican city central committee of St. Louis 1936-1942.
He served as a member of the advisory council of the Republican National Committee in 1943.
He served as a delegate to the Republican National Convention in 1940.

Miller was elected as a Republican to the Seventy-eighth Congress (January 3, 1943 – January 3, 1945).
He was an unsuccessful candidate for reelection in 1944 to the Seventy-ninth Congress.
He continued the practice of law in St. Louis, Missouri, until his death there November 1, 1952.
He was interred in Calvary Cemetery.

References

1899 births
1952 deaths
Politicians from St. Louis
Republican Party members of the United States House of Representatives from Missouri
Saint Louis University School of Law alumni
20th-century American politicians